This list of tallest buildings by height to roof ranks completed skyscrapers by height to roof which reach a height of 300 metres (984 ft) or more. Only buildings with continuously occupiable floors are included, thus non-building structures including towers, are not included. Some assessments of the tallest building use 'height to roof' to determine tallest building, as 'architectural feature' is regarded as a subjective and an imprecise comparative measure. However, in November 2009, the CTBUH stopped using the roof height as the metric for tall buildings because modern tall buildings rarely have a part of the building that can categorically be deemed the roof.

List

References 

Lists of buildings and structures
 
Lists of construction records